Ahmad El Esseily, born 1976, is an Egyptian film and television editor/director, and host of radio and television shows. He graduated from the German Department of the Faculty of Alsun (Linguistics) in 1997.

From 1999 to 2004 Esseily was a professional film editor, assistant director and director, working mainly on television commercials, music videos, documentaries, short films and Satellite programs for Egyptian and Arabian channels.

Biography 

 FMTV Season I (TV & Radio Show) 2004–2005    	Mazzika TV & Nogoom FM
 FMTV Season II 	(TV & Radio Show)  		2005–2006	Mazzika TV & Nogoom FM
 "Thursday at eight" (الخميس الساعة تمانية)(On-air Radio Show) 2006	Nogoom FM
 (حبة عسيلي)(a bit of Esseily) (TV Show) Season I  	2007–2008	Otv
 (حبة عسيلي)(a bit of Esseily) (TV Show) Season II  	2008		Otv
 "Esseily on the radio" (عسيلي على الراديو) daily 5 min. during the morning show 2008 	Nogoom FM
 "Esseily on the radio in Ramadan" (عسيلي على الراديو في رمضان) Season I, II, III, IV	2007 / 2008 / 2009 / 2010 Nogoom FM		
 Esseily also writes a monthly article in "Us"(إحنا) magazine published by Core Publications since 2006 
 His first book "A book without a name" (كتاب مالوش إسم) was published in August 2009. 
 His second book titled "The second book" (الكتاب التاني) also published by "Dar el Shorouk" ) (دار الشروق) on 1 January. 2011.

References

1976 births
Living people
Egyptian television presenters
Egyptian radio presenters